The Bishop Hiram A. Boaz House is a historic house located at 22 Armistead Road in Little Rock, Arkansas.

Description and history 
It is a two-story, timber-framed structure, clad in brick and stucco with half-timbering in the Tudor Revival style. It was designed by Dallas, Texas architect Marion Fooshe under the supervision of the architect Charles L. Thompson, and was built in 1926 for Rev. Hiram A. Boaz, the first Methodist bishopt to reside in Arkansas and the first president of Southern Methodist University. It was listed on the National Register of Historic Places on March 7, 1994, for its architecture and historic associations.

References

Houses on the National Register of Historic Places in Arkansas
Tudor Revival architecture in Arkansas
Houses completed in 1926
Houses in Little Rock, Arkansas
National Register of Historic Places in Little Rock, Arkansas